Micah LeVar "Pastor" Troy (born November 18, 1977) is an American rapper and record producer. He is also a member of the hardcore rap group D.S.G.B. (Down South Georgia Boyz). In 2020, he made several homophobic statements against Lil Nas X that generated considerable controversy.

Early life
Micah LeVar Troy was born on November 18, 1977 in College Park, Georgia. His father, Alfred Troy, is a former drill instructor turned pastor.

Troy graduated from Creekside High School and attended Paine College in Augusta, Georgia, before deciding to fully pursue his career in rap. His rap name comes from his last name and his father's profession as a pastor, and is also a pun on the name Castor Troy, a character from John Woo's 1997 film Face/Off, played by Nicolas Cage and John Travolta.  His fourth album is titled Face Off in reference to the movie.

Career
He released his first album, We Ready (I Declare War), in 1999. To generate attention and buzz, he attacked Master P verbally on the infamous "No Mo Play in G. A."

Ludacris featured Troy on his album Back for the First Time for the song "Get Off Me". In addition, Pastor Troy is the front man of the rap group D.S.G.B. (Down South Georgia Boyz). DSGB originated in Augusta, Georgia. He was also featured on the collaborative album Kings of Crunk by Lil Jon in the song "Throw it Up". In 2002, Troy's album Universal Soldier became popular in the South, especially with the song "Are We Cuttin'" featuring Ms. Jade, which was also featured on the soundtrack for the action film xXx that year. The album debuted at #13 on the Billboard 200. In 2003, Troy appeared on Young Jeezy's 2003 album Come Shop wit' Me on the track titled "GA".

Troy released By Any Means Necessary in 2004. Following this album, Troy was released from his Universal contract because of creativity disputes. He then released Face Off, Part II, which addressed some issues with Lil Scrappy and BME. In 2005, he appeared with Killer Mike on Chamillionaire's track "Southern Takeover" off of The Sound of Revenge.

He released three albums in 2006, starting with Stay Tru, then followed by By Choice Or By Force and Atlanta 2 Memphis, which is a collaboration album with Memphis rapper Criminal Manne. Stay Tru debuted at the Billboard 200 at #150, selling 6,000 copies its first week.

Troy released his 16th solo album, Ready For War, in June 2009, and released seven more studio albums then and 2011. In 2012, he released The Last OutLaw, and in 2013, he released The Streets Need You. In 2014, he released Crown Royal Part 4 mixtape, as well as the album Welcome to the Rap Game, while he released the sixth edition of his Crown Royal mixtape series in 2015 along with WAR (We Are Ready) in Atlanta, which featured by Paul Wall and Bun B.

In 2017, Troy announced his retirement and released his last album "O.G.P.T" in July. He also announced he was in the process of completing his second movie, titled Down 2 Come Up, which he wrote, directed, and starred in, which was slated for released on March 17, 2020. He later released two albums, "Clubber Lang" and "Enemy of the State".

In January 2020, Pastor Troy made homophobic comments on the outfit Lil Nas X wore during the Grammy Awards. In a subsequent interview, Pastor Troy said he was not being homophobic but then claimed that "being gay isn't right" and made several other homophobic comments.

Awards 
On April 5, 2016, Pastor Troy received the Legends of ATL Award from BMI for his contributions to music in Atlanta.

Discography

Studio albums

Collaborations
With D.S.G.B.

Other collaborations

Mixtapes, compilations and remix albums

Singles

Collaboration singles

Production credits

Pastor Troy
Book I (by Pastor Troy & The Congregation):
"Havin' A Bad Day"
Face Off:
"This Tha City"
"My Niggaz Is The Grind"
"Move To Mars"
"Throw Your Flags Up"
"No Mo Play In GA"
"Eternal Yard Dash" with Big Toombs
"Oh Father"
Universal Soldier
"Universal Soldier"
"Bless America"
Face Off (Part II):
"WWW (Who, Want, War)"
"Where Them Niggaz At"
"Respect Game"
Tool Muziq:
"I'm Down"

D.S.G.B.
The Last Supper:
"We Dem Georgia Boyz"
"My Folks"
"Brang Ya Army"
"Above The Law II"
"Southside"
"Repent"
Til Death Do Us Part:
"I'm Outside Ho"
"Sittin' On Thangs" with Taj Mahal

References

External links

1977 births
Living people
African-American crunk musicians
African-American male rappers
African-American record producers
American hip hop record producers
American rappers of Haitian descent
Paine College alumni
Musicians from Augusta, Georgia
Prophet Entertainment
Rappers from Atlanta
Southern hip hop musicians
Gangsta rappers
Hardcore hip hop artists
21st-century American rappers
21st-century American male musicians
21st-century African-American musicians
20th-century African-American people